Flynn of the Inland is a biography by Ion Idriess of John Flynn, founder of the Royal Flying Doctors service.

It was one of his most successful books.

References

External links
Flynn of the Inland at Ion Idriess Fan Page

Australian biographies
1932 non-fiction books
English-language books
Royal Flying Doctor Service of Australia
Books by Ion Idriess
Angus & Robertson books